The Tarnița–Lăpuștești Hydropower Plant is a proposed hydroelectric pumped-storage project on the Someșul Cald River in Cluj County, Romania.  If built it would be the largest hydro-electric load balancing system in Romania. During the night, when the demand is low and electricity is cheap because of powerplants which generate electricity continuously, such as the Cernavodă nuclear power plant, it will use electricity to pump water up the hill, while during the day, it will use the hydro energy to generate electricity.

Location

Power generation
The power station will have four turbines, each capable of producing 250 megawatts, for a total of 1000 megawatts.

Schedule
Construction has not started. The Romanian state is looking for investors. The strategic environmental assessment (SEA) procedure is at the beginning, the environmental impact assessment (EIA) procedure did not start yet, as the project consultants admitted publicly on 17 November 2010. In 2016 the Romanian government stated that several smaller projects were being considered instead. In 2019, Romania’s Forecast and Strategy National Committee (CNSP) started a procedure for finding a private partner for the Tarnița–Lăpuștești pumped-storage hydropower plant.

See also

Hydro-electricity
Iron Gate I Hydro Power Plant
Lotru-Ciunget Hydropower Plant

References

Proposed pumped-storage hydroelectric power stations
Proposed renewable energy power stations in Romania
Hydroelectric power stations in Romania